The Douglas Astro was a design concept for a fully reusable space launch system from the Douglas Aircraft Company.  It combined two manned lifting bodies, with only one of them achieving orbit. The system was designed around much existing hardware from the Apollo and other US space programs.

See also
 BAC Mustard
 Triamese

References

Former proposed space launch system concepts
Two-stage-to-orbit
Space launch vehicles of the United States